"Sacred Emotion" is a pop ballad performed by Donny Osmond. The song was the second single released from the 1989 album Donny Osmond. It reached No. 4 on the Billboard Adult Contemporary chart and No. 13 on the Billboard Hot 100 chart in 1989.

1989 singles
1989 songs
Donny Osmond songs
Pop ballads
Songs written by Carl Sturken and Evan Rogers